Tapting  is a village development committee in Solukhumbu District in the Sagarmatha Zone of north-eastern Nepal. At the time of the 1991 Nepal census it had a population of 2016 people living in 339 individual households. According to recent population research data in 2015,the population of Tapting VDC is 7580,living in 4850 individual households.
Transportation-->  = High Way Road is Connected from Capital Kathmandu to Tapting VDC.

References

External links
UN map of the municipalities of Solukhumbu District

Populated places in Solukhumbu District